Arnold Grimpel (also Arnold Krimpel; 2 April 1901 Valga – 1938 Soviet Union) was an Estonian politician. He was a member of III Riigikogu.

On 4 December 1928, he was removed from his position and he was replaced by Mihkel Krents.

References

1901 births
1938 deaths
People from Valga, Estonia
People from Kreis Walk
Estonian Workers' Party politicians
Members of the Riigikogu, 1926–1929
Estonian emigrants to the Soviet Union
Great Purge victims from Estonia